The International Journal of Older People Nursing is a quarterly peer-reviewed nursing journal published by Wiley. It covers advances in knowledge and practice in gerontological nursing.

History
The journal was established in 2006 by Brendan McCormack (Queen Margaret University). The journal aims to challenge assumptions and promote critical analysis in order to advance nursing practice and inform debates about health and social care for older people worldwide. Its editor-in-chief is Sarah H. Kagan (University of Pennsylvania).

Abstracting and indexing
The journal is abstracted and indexed in:
CINAHL
Current Contents/Social & Behavioral Sciences
ProQuest databases 
MEDLINE/PubMed
PsycINFO
Science Citation Index Expanded 
Scopus
Social Sciences Citation Index 

According to the Journal Citation Reports, the journal has a 2020 impact factor of 2.115.

References

External links

Gerontological nursing journals
Publications established in 2006
Wiley (publisher) academic journals
Quarterly journals
English-language journals